Liang Zhiping (Chinese: 梁治平; Pinyin: Liáng Zhìpíng; born 1959) is a famous legal scholar in China.

Biography
Liang Zhiping received an LL.B degree from Southwest College of Political Science and Law in 1982, and an LL.M degree from Renmin University of China Law School in 1985.

After graduation, he joined the faculty of Renmin University. He later left this university in 1993, and joined the Chinese Art Institute (中国艺术研究院中国文化研究所). He is a  visiting scholar of Harvard University, Columbia University, The University of Hong Kong and guest professor of The Chinese University of Hong Kong.

Works
Liang Zhiping have written some influential books for Chinese legal academy such as Xin Bosiren Xinzha (新波斯人信札, coauthor, 1987), etc.

References

External links
 Liang Zhiping's homepage (Chinese)
 Explicating Law: A Comparative Perspective of Chinese and Western Legal Culture

1959 births
Living people
Chinese jurists
Scholars of Chinese law
Renmin University of China alumni
Southwest University of Political Science & Law alumni